Keith Sandiford may refer to:

 Keith A. Sandiford (born 1947), Barbadian writer living in the US
 Keith A. P. Sandiford (born 1936), Barbadian writer living in Canada